Chesterton is a former United Kingdom Parliamentary constituency. It was created upon the splitting up of the three member Cambridgeshire constituency into three single member divisions in 1885. The seat was abolished in 1918 when Cambridgeshire was recreated as a single-member constituency.

Boundaries

The Redistribution of Seats Act 1885 split the former three-member Cambridgeshire parliamentary county into three single-member divisions. One of these was the Western or Chesterton Division, and the other two were Newmarket and Wisbech. The seat was named after the town of Chesterton, the only urban area in the constituency, and a suburb of the university town of Cambridge. The built-up area of Chesterton was included within the municipal boundaries of Cambridge in 1912, but this did not affect the constituency.

The remainder of the constituency consisted of the following civil parishes: Abington Pigotts, Arrington, Barrington, Bartlow, Barton, Bassingbourn, Bourn, Boxworth, Caldecote, Caxton, Childerley, Comberton, Conington, Coton, Cottenham, Croxton, Croydon, Dry Drayton, East Hatley, Elsworth, Eltisley, Fowlmere, Foxton, Gamlingay, Girton, Grantchester, Graveley, Great Eversden, Great Shelford, Grunty Fen, Guilden Morden, Haddenham, Hardwick, Harlton, Harston, Haslingfield, Hatley St George, Hauxton, Histon, Impington, Kingston, Knapwell, Kneesworth, Landbeach, Litlington, Little Eversden, Little Gransden, Little Shelford, Lolworth, Long Stanton All Saints, Long Stanton St Michael, Longstowe, Madingley, Melbourn, Meldreth, Mepal, Milton, Newton, Oakington, Orwell, Over, Papworth Everard, the part of Papworth St Agnes in Cambridgeshire, Rampton, the part of Royston in Cambridgeshire, Shepreth, Shingay, Stapleford, Steeple Morden, Stretham, Sutton, Swavesey, Tadlow, Thetford, Thriplow, Toft, Trumpington, Waterbeach, Wendy, Wentworth, Westwick, Whaddon, Wilburton, Willingham, Wimpole, Witcham and Witchford.

Upon its abolition under the Representation of the People Act 1918, the majority of the constituency was combined with the Newmarket (or East Cambridgeshire) division to create a new single member Cambridgeshire seat.  Chesterton and areas to the south of Cambridge, which had been added to the Municipal Borough of Cambridge, were now included in the Parliamentary Borough of Cambridge. northernmost parts were included in the new Isle of Ely constituency.

Members of Parliament

Election results

Elections in the 1880s

Elections in the 1890s

Elections in the 1900s

Elections in the 1910s

Montagu was subsequently returned unopposed in three by-elections: in 1915 and 1916 upon his appointment as Chancellor of the Duchy of Lancaster, and in 1917 when he was appointed Secretary of State for India

See also
Parliamentary representation from Cambridgeshire
List of former United Kingdom Parliament constituencies

References
 

Parliamentary constituencies in Cambridgeshire (historic)
Constituencies of the Parliament of the United Kingdom established in 1885
Constituencies of the Parliament of the United Kingdom disestablished in 1918